Cheryl Lau Sang (born 5 August 1951), known professionally as Samantha Sang, is an Australian singer. She had an earlier career as a teenage singer under the stage name Cheryl Gray, before adopting the stage name she is more widely known as in 1969. She first received nationwide recognition in Australia in 1967, after releasing the top ten single "You Made Me What I Am".

By 1969, Sang relocated to the United Kingdom, where she worked with the Bee Gees, before returning to Australia in 1975. She reconnected with the Bee Gees in 1977 and had an international hit with their song "Emotion", peaking at number three on the Billboard Hot 100, number two in Australia and number eleven in the United Kingdom. The single's parent album, Emotion (1978), reached the top thirty on Billboard 200 and included two other singles.

Life and career

Early life
Sang was born to Reg and Joan (née Clarke) Sang in Melbourne, Australia, the great-great-granddaughter of a Chinese herbalist and surgeon. Her father ran a singing school and performed professionally as Reg Gray. Sang began her career at the age of eight by singing on Australian radio and entered and won talent contests.

1966-1974: First recordings
In December 1966, she released her debut single, "The Real Thing" (not to be confused with fellow Australian Russell Morris' 1969 hit song "The Real Thing"), under the name "Cheryl Gray". It was issued by EMI Records on their HMV label and was quickly followed by her second single, "In a Woman's Eyes".

Her third single, "You Made Me What I Am", was released in May 1967 and reached number eight on the Go-Set Top 40. Teen magazine, Go-Set ran a poll in August for pop performers and Gray was voted third in the 'Top Girl Singer' category behind Lynne Randell and Bev Harrell. Sang released three more singles on HMV but none charted. She became a singer on Australian television, but she felt her career was limited if she remained in Australia. In 1969, Sang travelled to the United Kingdom where Barry Gibb of the Bee Gees heard her singing and urged his manager, Robert Stigwood, to sign her. Under Stigwood's management she changed her name to "Samantha Sang". Gibb co-wrote "Love of a Woman" with his brother Maurice. Sang's version – with Barry Gibb supplying backing vocals, guitar and producing – was released in August. It was a minor hit in some European countries.

Sang followed with "Nothing in the World Like Love" written by UK pop singer-songwriter Labi Siffre. Visa restrictions forced her out of the UK and she returned to Australia.

1975-1990s: Mainstream success
By 1975, Sang had changed management and signed with Polydor which released three singles and her debut album, Samantha Sang and Rocked the World.

In 1977, she recorded "When Love Is Gone", the theme song for French drama film Bilitis.

She visited Barry Gibb in France whilst the Bee Gees were recording songs for the Saturday Night Fever soundtrack. A new song, "Emotion", was written for her by Barry and Robin Gibb. The single was co-produced by Barry with the Bee Gees' production team of Albhy Galuten and Karl Richardson. Released in 1978, with backing vocals by Barry, it showcased a softer style and became a major hit worldwide. It reached number three on the US Billboard Hot 100 in March 1978, and earned a platinum record. It peaked at number eleven on the UK Singles Chart and at number two on the Australian Kent Music Report Singles Chart.

Her following album, Emotion, although not produced by Barry Gibb, included a version of "Charade", a little-known Bee Gees' song from their 1974 album Mr. Natural. Emotion peaked at No. 29 on the Billboard 200 and achieved a gold record in March 1978. Determined to succeed on her own merits, Sang did not record another Gibb song to capitalise on her success, but chose a disco track, "You Keep Me Dancing", as her next single. It peaked at No. 56 on the US Hot 100 (NZ # 21, Canada AC #10) and was followed into the charts by her cover of Wilson Pickett's "In the Midnight Hour".

She recorded a cover of Eric Carmen's Top 20 single, "Change of Heart", featured as the B-side of "You Keep Me Dancing". Her third album, From Dance to Love, was released by United Artists in 1979.

1999-present: Later years
In 1999, residing again in Melbourne, Sang made a short return to live performing, with her father Reg as guest vocalist. In 2004, Sang's three albums were released for the first time on CD in a two-piece set as the compilation The Ultimate Collection.

Discography

Studio albums

Compilation albums

Singles

Awards and nominations

Go-Set Pop Poll
The Go-Set Pop Poll was coordinated by teen-oriented pop music newspaper Go-Set and was established in February 1966 and conducted an annual poll from 1966 to 1972 of its readers to determine the most popular personalities.

|-
| 1967
| herself (Cheryl Gray)
| Top Female Singer
| style="background:tan;"| 3rd
|-
| 1968
| herself (Cheryl Gray)
| Top Female Singer
| 5th
|-

TELEVISION

References

External links
Pop Archive feature "Emotion"

1951 births
Australian dance musicians
Australian disco musicians
Australian expatriates in the United Kingdom
Australian women pop singers
Australian people of Chinese descent
EMI Group artists
Living people
Singers from Melbourne
Private Stock Records artists
20th-century Australian women singers
21st-century Australian women singers